Bentley B. Rayburn (born June 15, 1953) is an American retired Air Force major general and businessman.

Rayburn graduated from the U.S. Air Force Academy, Georgetown University, and the U.S. Army Command and General Staff College. He was named one of the Ten Outstanding Young Americans for 1990. Serving as a colonel, Rayburn was assigned to lead the 388th Fighter Wing in 1995. He served as Commandant of the Air War College from 2001 to 2004, when he was appointed Commander of the Air Force Doctrine Center, Alaska.

He ran again in 2008, against incumbent Doug Lamborn. He challenged Lamborn again in the 2014 elections, but lost, receiving 48% of the vote.

Rayburn formerly served as president of The Home Front Cares, a charity that supports the families of deployed soldiers. He served briefly as president of Colorado Technical University from 2010 to 2012.

Rayburn was awarded the Legion of Merit with oak leaf cluster; the Defense Meritorious Service Medal with oak leaf cluster, the Meritorious Service Medal with four oak leaf clusters; the Air Medal with two oak leaf clusters; the Aerial Achievement Medal with oak leaf cluster; and the Air Force Commendation Medal.

References

External links

Living people
United States Air Force generals
Colorado Republicans
Place of birth missing (living people)
Businesspeople from Colorado
1953 births
Heads of universities and colleges in the United States
United States Air Force Academy alumni
Georgetown University alumni
United States Army Command and General Staff College alumni
Air University (United States Air Force) faculty
Major generals
Recipients of the Legion of Merit
Recipients of the Meritorious Service Medal (United States)
Recipients of the Air Medal